Deutsche Schule Ho Chi Minh City - International German School, shortened as IGS, is an international and overseas German school in Ho Chi Minh City offering a German education from Kindergarten to IB Diploma.  German graduation certificates (from 2020) and the mixed-language IB diploma program (from 2022) are offered.

Profile
The International German School (IGS) was founded in 2012, initiated by the Federal Foreign Office and carried by the Stiftung Bildung und Handwerk (SBH).

Gallery

External links
 International German School Ho Chi Minh City website

References

German international schools in Asia
International schools in Ho Chi Minh City
Educational institutions established in 2012
2012 establishments in Vietnam